Scolobates is a genus of parasitoid wasps belonging to the family Ichneumonidae.

The species of this genus are found in Europe and Northern America.

Species:
 Scolobates auriculatus (Fabricius, 1804) 
 Scolobates fennicus Schmiedeknecht, 1912

References

Ichneumonidae
Ichneumonidae genera